Phytoecia melanocephala is a species of beetle in the family Cerambycidae. It was described by Johan Christian Fabricius in 1787, originally under the genus Saperda. It is known from Morocco, Libya, Algeria, Sicily, and Tunisia.

References

Phytoecia
Beetles described in 1787